The Women's individual pursuit competition at the 2017 World Championships was held on 15 April 2017.

Results

Qualifying
The first two racers raced for gold, the third and fourth fastest rider raced for the bronze medal.

Finals
The finals were started at 21:01.

References

Women's individual pursuit
UCI Track Cycling World Championships – Women's individual pursuit
UCI